Simmen is a surname. Notable people with the surname include:

 Christian Simmen (1899–?), Swiss sprinter
 Gian Simmen (born 1977), Swiss snowboarder
 Matthias Simmen (born 1972), Swiss biathlete

See also
 Simen